Lt.-Col. Francis Coningsby Hannam Clarke  (4 February 1842 – 27 August 1893) was a British military officer who served as the first Commander of the Ceylon Volunteers. He was appointed on 20 April 1888 until 27 August 1893. He succeeded William Wilby as General Officer Commanding, Ceylon. He was succeeded by Henry Byrde.

References

Commanders of the Ceylon Defence Force
Fellows of the Royal Geographical Society
1842 births
1893 deaths
Companions of the Order of St Michael and St George
Royal Artillery officers